The Sand Pebbles is a 1966 American epic war film directed by Robert Wise in Panavision. It tells the story of an independent, rebellious U.S. Navy machinist's mate, first class, aboard the fictional river gunboat USS San Pablo, on Yangtze Patrol in 1920s China.

The film features Steve McQueen, Richard Attenborough, Richard Crenna, Candice Bergen, Mako, Simon Oakland, Larry Gates,  and Marayat Andriane. Robert Anderson adapted the screenplay from the 1962 novel of the same name by Richard McKenna.

The Sand Pebbles was a critical and commercial success at its general release. It became the fourth highest-grossing film of 1966 and was nominated for eight Academy Awards and eight Golden Globe Awards, with Attenborough winning the Golden Globe for Best Supporting Actor.

Plot
In 1926, Petty officer, first class Jake Holman transfers to the Yangtze River Patrol gunboat USS San Pablo. The ship is nicknamed the "Sand Pebble" and its sailors are "Sand Pebbles".

The crew has hired coolies to do most of the work. Holman, as chief Machinist's Mate, takes hands-on responsibility for the operation and maintenance of the ship's engine, upsetting the head engine room coolie, Chien. Holman also earns the antipathy of most of his fellow sailors, but does become close friends with Frenchy, a seasoned yet sensitive sailor.

While the ship is under way on patrol, Holman discovers a serious problem with the engine. He informs the captain, Lieutenant Collins, that they must stop for repairs, but Collins refuses until executive officer Bordelles declares a mechanical emergency. Chien insists on making the repairs, and Holman acquiesces so that Chien can save face. Chien is killed when the locked engine slips into gear, and chief coolie Lop-eye Shing blames Holman. Holman selects Po-Han to take on Chien's work; in time, the two become friends.

Po-Han is harassed by a large, bullying sailor named Stawski, resulting in a boxing match on which the crewmen place bets. Holman is in the corner of his friend Po-Han, who, despite being badly beaten by Stawski, eventually prevails. His victory leads to more friction between Holman and the rest of the crew.

When news comes of an incident involving British gunboats, Collins orders the crew not to return any fire from the Chinese, to avoid a diplomatic incident. Lop-eye Shing purposely sends Po-Han ashore, where he is predictably chased down the beach, captured, and slowly tortured by a mob. When Collins is unable to buy Po-Han's release, Po-Han begs for someone to kill him; Holman disobeys orders and shoots his friend.

The San Pablo remains moored on the Xiang River at Changsha, due to low water levels, through the winter of 1926–27. It must deal with increasingly hostile crowds surrounding it in numerous smaller boats. Lt Collins also fears a mutiny.

Frenchy has saved an educated Chinese woman, Maily, from prostitution by paying her debts. He marries her and regularly swims ashore to visit, but dies of pneumonia one night. Holman finds Maily sitting by Frenchy's corpse. Some Chinese men burst in, beat Holman, and kill Maily for which they frame Holman. The next day several Chinese demand Holman be turned over to them as the "murderer" of Maily and her unborn baby. When the demand is rejected, the Chinese blockade the gunboat. The crew fear for their safety and demand that Holman surrender to the Chinese. Order is not restored until Collins fires a Lewis gun across the bow of one of the Chinese sampans.

With spring's arrival, the crew can restart river patrols, but the Nanking Incident results in orders to return to the coast. Collins disobeys and travels upstream of Dongting Lake to evacuate idealistic, anti-imperialist missionary Jameson and his school-teacher assistant, Shirley Eckert, from a remote mission. Holman had met Eckert in Hangkow months earlier, and the two had fledgling romantic feelings for each other.

The San Pablo must break through a boom made up of junks linked by a massive bamboo rope blocking the river. A boarding party is sent to cut the rope. Fighting breaks out in which twelve US crewmen and many more Chinese are killed. Holman chops through the rope, with an axe, while under fire. He is forced to kill a young Chinese militiaman who attacks him, then recognizes him as a friend of Jameson and Eckert. The ship continues upriver.

Collins leads Holman, Crosley, and Bronson ashore. Jameson refuses rescue, claiming that he and Eckert have renounced their US citizenship. Collins orders Holman to forcibly remove Eckert and Jameson, but Holman declares he is going to stay with them. Nationalist soldiers suddenly attack, killing Jameson. Collins orders the patrol to take Eckert to the ship, and remains behind to provide covering fire. Collins is killed, ironically leaving the normally rebellious Holman in command. Holman and Eckert have a tearful parting, finally declaring their love for each other, with Holman assuring her he will be following shortly. Holman kills a dozen soldiers but is fatally shot just when he is about to rejoin the others. His last bewildered words are, "I was home. What happened. What the hell happened?"

Eckert and the remaining two sailors reach the ship, and the San Pablo sails away.

Cast

Former child actor and career naval officer Frank Coghlan, Jr. was the technical advisor to the film regarding the U.S. Navy and made an uncredited appearance as one of the American businessmen stripping Maily.

Production

Development
For years Robert Wise had wanted to make The Sand Pebbles, but the film companies were reluctant to finance it. The Sand Pebbles was eventually paid for, but because its production required extensive location scouting and pre-production work, as well as being monsoon-affected in Taipei, its producer and director Wise realised that it would be over a year before principal photography could begin. At the insistence of the film company, Wise agreed to direct a "fill-in" project, The Sound of Music, a film that became one of the most popular and acclaimed films of the 1960s.

Pre-production
The film company spent $250,000 building a replica gunboat named the San Pablo, based on the —a former Spanish Navy gunboat that was seized by the US Navy in the Philippine Islands during the Spanish–American War (1898–99)—but with a greatly reduced draft to allow sailing on the shallow Tam Sui and Keelung Rivers. A seaworthy vessel that was actually powered by Cummins diesel engines, the San Pablo made the voyage from Hong Kong to Taiwan and back under her own power during shooting of The Sand Pebbles. After filming was completed, the San Pablo was sold to the DeLong Timber Company and renamed the Nola D, then later sold to Seiscom Delta Exploration Co., which used her as a floating base camp with significant modifications, including removal of her engines and the addition of a helipad. The boat was towed to Singapore and broken up in 1975

Robert Wise's cinematographer from The Sound of Music, Ted McCord, had taken a scouting trip to the Asian locations but informed Wise that his heart problems made him not capable enough to shoot the film.

Filming
The Sand Pebbles was filmed both in Taiwan and Hong Kong. Its filming, which began on November 22, 1965, at Keelung, was scheduled to take about nine weeks, but it ended up taking seven months.  The cast and crew took a break for the Christmas holidays at Tamsui, Taipei.

At one point a 15-foot camera boat capsized on the Keelung River, setting back the schedule because the soundboard was ruined when it sank. When the filming was finally completed in Taiwan, the government of the Republic of China held several members of the crew, including McQueen and his family, supposedly "hostage" by keeping their passports because of unpaid additional taxes. In March 1966 the filming moved to Hong Kong and the Shaw Brothers studio for three months, mainly for scenes in Sai Kung and Tung Chung, and then in June it travelled  to Hollywood to finish its interior scenes at the Fox Studios.

Due to frequent rain and other difficulties in Hong Kong, the filming was nearly abandoned. When he returned to Los Angeles, McQueen fell ill because he had an abscessed molar. He had not wanted to see a dentist until he returned to California. His dentist and physician ordered him to take an extended period of rest—one that halted production again for weeks.

Some filming took place on the dreadnought-type battleship USS Texas, but these scenes were cut from the final film and have been lost.

Themes and background
The military life of the San Pablos crew, the titular 'sand pebbles', portrays the era's culture and colonialism on a small scale through the sailors' relations with the coolies who run their gunboat and the bargirls who serve them off-duty, as well as on a large scale, with the West's gunboat diplomacy domination of China.

Although the 1962 novel antedated extensive US activity in Vietnam and was not based on any historic incidents, by the December 1966 release of the film it was seen as an explicit statement on the US's extensive combat involvement in the Vietnam War in reviews published by The New York Times and Life magazine.

Release
It rained the night of the premiere, December 20, 1966, at the Rivoli Theatre in New York City. Afterwards, McQueen did not do any film work for about a year due to exhaustion, saying that whatever sins he had committed in his life had been paid for when he made The Sand Pebbles.McQueen Toffel, Neile, (1986). – Excerpt: My Husband, My Friend . – (c/o The Sand Pebbles). – New York, New York: Atheneum. –  The performance earned McQueen the only Academy Award nomination of his career. He was not seen on film again until two 1968 films, The Thomas Crown Affair and Bullitt (which included his fellow Sand Pebbles actor Simon Oakland as Bullitt's boss).

Critical reception
The film was acclaimed by a wide array of critics. The film has an 89% rating on Rotten Tomatoes based on 18 reviews.

Bosley Crowther of The New York Times called it "a beautifully mounted film" with "a curiously turgid and uneven attempt to generate a war romance." Crowther thought that "it is not as historical romance that it is likely to grab the audience, but as a weird sort of hint of what has happened and is happening in Vietnam." Arthur D. Murphy of Variety declared it "a handsome production, boasting some excellent characterizations. Steve McQueen delivers an outstanding performance." Philip K. Scheuer of the Los Angeles Times called it "adventure on the grand scale, of a kind on which the British have too long enjoyed an exclusive monopoly. 'The Sand Pebbles' earns a place up there beside 'The Bridge on the River Kwai,' 'Lawrence of Arabia,' 'Doctor Zhivago,' et al ... Too, the parallel with 1966 and Vietnam could hardly be more timely." Richard L. Coe of The Washington Post called the film "a strong story with highly unusual backgrounds, a character perfectly suited to Steve McQueen and an engrossing drive that falters only because three hours is a bit much."  The Monthly Film Bulletin wrote, "History, of course, never really repeats itself in the way script-writers would like it to, and the parallel between China in 1926 and Vietnam today is distinctly dubious. But this striking of attitudes is the film's undoing, since it seriously undermines the narrative by presenting the characters as little more than pawns in a didactic chess game. And in any case, the script never decides which side of the political fence it wants to sit on." Brendan Gill of The New Yorker wrote that McQueen "works hard and well" in his role but described Robert Wise's direction as "molasses-in-January."

Box office
According to Fox records, the film needed to earn $21,200,000 in rentals to break even and by December 1970 made $20,600,000. In September 1970 the studio recorded a loss for $895,000 on the movie.

Accolades

The film is recognised by American Film Institute in these lists:
 2005: AFI's 100 Years of Film Scores – Nominated

Additional footage
After more than 40 years 20th Century Fox found 14 minutes of footage that had been cut from the film's initial roadshow version shown at New York's Rivoli Theater. The restored version has been released on DVD. The sequences are spread throughout the film and add texture to the story, though they do not alter it in any significant way.

See also
 List of American films of 1966
 On the Town (1949), film
 The Cruel Sea (1953), film
 The Caine Mutiny (1954), film
 Mister Roberts (1955), film
 Blood Alley (1955), film
 Yangtse Incident (1957), film
 The World of Suzie Wong (1960), film
 Brown-water navy
 Gunboat diplomacy

References

External links
 
 
 
 
 thesandpebbles.com, a website devoted exclusively to The Sand PebblesReviews'''
 Review – 1967, from the Movie Review Query Engine
 Review at TV Guide''
 USSPanay.org, a website about the evacuation of Nanking and the Panay Incident

1966 films
1960s English-language films
Mandarin-language films
1960s adventure drama films
1960s war drama films
20th Century Fox films
American war drama films
American epic films
Films about Chinese Americans
Films scored by Jerry Goldsmith
Films based on American novels
Films directed by Robert Wise
Films set on ships
Films set in the Republic of China (1912–1949)
Films set in 1926
Films set in China
Films shot in Taiwan
Riverine warfare
Films about the United States Navy
Yangtze River
American adventure drama films
Films featuring a Best Supporting Actor Golden Globe winning performance
1966 drama films
Chinese-language American films
1960s American films
Films produced by Robert Wise